Justin Blanchet (born 25 August 1993 in Canada) is a former Canadian rugby union player who played for the Exeter Chiefs and Bedford Blues. His playing position was flanker. He retired following his fourth concussion sustained in a warm-up match in the lead up to the 2019 Rugby World Cup. Previously, he had earned 7 caps for the Canada national team, making his debut against Brazil in the 2019 Americas Rugby Championship. His performances in the rest of the tournament saw him named in the Canada squad for the 2019 Rugby World Cup, however he withdrew from the squad following his concussion on 10 September 2019, following the warm-up match against the United States.

Reference list

External links
itsrugby.co.uk profile

1993 births
Canadian rugby union players
Canada international rugby union players
Living people
Rugby union flankers